This is a list of all lighthouses in the U.S. state of Virginia as identified by the United States Coast Guard. There are nine active lights in the state as well as three automated caissons and eleven skeleton towers replacing previously staffed lights.

The first lighthouse in the state was erected in 1792 (the first Cape Henry Light) and it is the oldest surviving structure; the last, Chesapeake Light, was built in 1965 (ignoring automated towers erected later). The tallest extant tower is that at Cape Charles Light.

If not otherwise noted, focal height and coordinates are taken from the United States Coast Guard Light List, while location and dates of activation, automation, and deactivation are taken from the United States Coast Guard Historical information site for lighthouses. Locations of demolished lights have been estimated using National Oceanic and Atmospheric Administration (NOAA) navigational charts.

References

Virginia
 
Lighthouses
Lighthouses